Imagined Communities: Reflections on the Origin and Spread of Nationalism is a book by Benedict Anderson about the development of national feeling in different eras and throughout different geographies across the world. It introduced the term "imagined communities" as a descriptor of a social group—specifically nations—and the term has since entered standard usage in myriad political and social science fields. The book was first published in 1983 and was reissued with additional chapters in 1991 and a further revised version in 2006.

The book is widely considered influential in the social sciences, with Eric G.E. Zuelow describing the book as "perhaps the most read book about nationalism."  It is among the top 10 most-cited publications in the social sciences.

Historical argument
According to Anderson's theory of imagined communities, the main historical causes of nationalism include:

 the increasing importance of mass vernacular literacy,
 the movement to abolish the ideas of rule by divine right and hereditary monarchy ("the concept was born in an age in which Enlightenment and Revolution were destroying the legitimacy of the divinely ordained, hierarchical dynastic realm....[N]ations dream of being free...The gage and emblem of this freedom is the sovereign state...", 1991, 7); 
 and the emergence of  Print capitalism ("the convergence of capitalism and print technology... standardization of national calendars, clocks and language was embodied in books and the publication of daily newspapers")

All of these phenomena coincided with the start of the Industrial Revolution.

Nation as an imagined community
According to Anderson, nations are socially constructed. For Anderson, the idea of the "nation" is relatively new and is a product of various socio-material forces. He defined a nation as "an imagined political community – and imagined as both inherently limited and sovereign". As Anderson puts it, a nation "is imagined because the members of even the smallest nation will never know most of their fellow-members, meet them, or even hear of them, yet in the minds of each lives the image of their communion." While members of the community probably will never know each of the other members face to face, they may have similar interests or identify as part of the same nation. Members hold in their minds a mental image of their affinity: for example, the nationhood felt with other members of your nation when your "imagined community" participates in a larger event such as the Olympic Games.

Nations are "limited" in that they have "finite, if elastic boundaries, beyond which lie other nations". They are "sovereign" since no dynastic monarchy can claim authority over them, in the modern period:

Even though we may never see anyone in our imagined community, we still know they are there through communication means such as newspapers. He describes the act of reading a daily paper as a "mass ceremony": “It is performed in silent privacy, in the lair of the skull. Yet each communicant is well aware that the ceremony he performs is being replicated simultaneously by thousands (or millions) of others of whose existence he is confident, yet of whose identity he has not the slightest notion.” (35)Finally, a nation is a community because,

Critique
The first major critique of Anderson's theory was Partha Chatterjee, who contends that European colonialism de facto imposed limits to nationalism: "Even our imaginations must remain forever colonized" (Chatterjee, 1993: 5).

The second criticism was its masculine vision of nationalism: "the very term horizontal comradeship [...] brings with it connotations of masculine solidarity" (Linda McDowell, 1999: 195).

Adrian Hastings criticised the modernist interpretations of Anderson and another Marxist historian, Eric Hobsbawm for restricting the emergence of nationalism to the modern period and the eighteenth century as ignoring the national feelings of the medieval period and the framework for national coexistence within the Bible and Christian theology.

See also 

 Nations and Nationalism (book) by Ernest Gellner and Gellner's theory of nationalism
 Nations and Nationalism Since 1780: Programme, Myth, Reality and The Invention of Tradition by Eric Hobsbawm

External links 
A review of the 2006 edition in the London Review of Books, Vol. 28 No. 18 · 21 September 2006, pages 6–8
A review of the 1983 edition by Anthony Reid published Pacific Affairs, Vol. 58, No. 3 (Autumn, 1985), pp. 497–499

References

1983 non-fiction books
Sociology books
Political science books
Books about nationalism
Social constructionism